Scymnus marginicollis is a species of dusky lady beetle in the family Coccinellidae. It is found in North America.

Subspecies
These two subspecies belong to the species Scymnus marginicollis:
 Scymnus marginicollis borealis Hatch
 Scymnus marginicollis marginicollis

References

Further reading

 

Coccinellidae
Articles created by Qbugbot
Beetles described in 1843